Dil Ki Rani is a 1947 Hindi-language film produced by P V Banker. The film is directed by Mohan Sinha. The film stars Raj Kapoor and  Madhubala in lead roles along with Shyam Sunder, Badri Prasad and Munshi Khanjar. The film's music was composed by Sachin Dev Burman. The film was based on a story written by Mohan Sinha.

Plot 
Madhav is a poet whose songs are played on the radio. He is called Madho by his best friend Banke. Rajkumari, a great admirer of Madhav’s songs asks her father a news paper publisher  to publish his poems in the newspaper to increase readership of their newspaper. Soon she finds out  Madhav and falls in love with him. On the day on which Rajkumari’s father Thakur Sangram Singh comes to meet Madhav, an accident occurs and Rajkumari’s sari gets burnt. It was in this occasion that Rajkumaris father enters the room and mistakes Banke for Madhav. He becomes very fond of Banke. Thakur finds many reasons to like Banke over Madhav, but fails to convince Rajkumari. Later Thakur accepts Rajkumari’s wish in front of her withinner motives to separate the Madhav and Rajkumari. Together with the help of his assistant Munshi, Thakur tries different methods to separate them but fails miserably. Later Banke convinces Madhav to leave his lover for him for which Madhav agrees and acts insane in front of her.

Cast 
 Raj Kapoor as Madhav
 Madhubala as Rajkumari Singh
 Shyam Sunder as Banke Bihari
 Badri Prasad as Thakur Sangram Singh
 Munshi Khanjar as Munshiji
 Altaf as Mohini

Soundtrack 

 "O Duniya Ke Rahne Valo Bolo Kahan Gaya Chitchor (Part 1)" - Raj Kapoor
 "O Duniya Ke Rahne Valo Bolo Kahan Gaya Chitchor (Part 2)" - Geeta Dutt, Shyam Sundar
“Mohabbat Ki Khana Kabhi Na Mittai” - Shyam Sundar
“Aaha More Mohan Ne Mujhko Bulaaya” -Geeta Dutt
“Aayenge Re Mere Man Ke Basaiyya Aayenge Re “ - Geeta Dutt
“Bigadi Hui Takdeer Meri Aa Ke Bana De “-Geeta Dutt
“Kyon Baalam Humse Rooth Gaye” - Geeta Dutt
“Loot Liya Dil Chitchor Ne Chupke Se Aa Ke ” - Shyam Sundar
“Sar Phod Phod Mar Jana”- Shyam Sundar

Reception 
Writing retrospectively, Upperstall stated that Dil Ki Rani was a "creaky, tacky and stilted film". It found the performances of Kapoor and Madhubala "laughable" and "amusing", and the songs only passable fares.

References

External links 

1947 films
1940s Hindi-language films
Indian romantic drama films
Indian black-and-white films